Islas de Gigantes (Spanish: Gigantes Islands lit: Giant Islands) (variously Islas Gigantes, Higantes group, or Gigantes group) is an island chain within the larger Western Visayas archipelago in the Visayan Sea. It is part of the municipality of Carles, Iloilo, Philippines, and the northernmost part of Iloilo province. The Gigantes islands consist of about ten islands; the two largest are Gigantes Norte (North Gigantes) and Gigantes Sur (South Gigantes). According to the 2010 census, it has a population of 12,224. There is also a lighthouse on Gigantes Norte.

Location and geography
A narrow  channel separates the two islands.

In addition to the two main islands, the Gigantes group includes the following minor islets: Bulubadiang, Gigantillo, and Gigantuna are islets southeast of Gigantes Norte, while Antonia, Bantigui, Cabugao, Tanguingui, and Turnina are islands and islets south of Gigantes Sur.

The Gigantes group consists of the following four barangays. On Gigantes Norte is Asluman and Granada and on Gigantes Sur is Lantangan and Gabi.

History
The Gigantes group used to be called Sabuluag, or Salauag, which is the name of a species of tree endemic to the islands. During the Spanish colonial era, the name was changed to Gigantes. Local legend describes coffins found inside Bakwitan Cave that contained gigantic sets of human bones, which constituted the name change. For this reason, locals also believe the island is inhabited by engkantos.

A lighthouse was built on Gigantes Norte some time before 1895. Designated ARLHS PHI-094, the white  tower features a keeper's house and a focal point  in the air, which flashes once every ten seconds. Lantangan Elementary School in Gigantes Sur has a student population of 1,144, which is higher than the populations of mainland schools.

Typhoons
Typhoon Fengshen, known in the Philippines as Frank, struck the Gigantes group in June 2008. Fengshen destroyed the original lighthouse on Gigantes Norte, which was one of the original 27 lighthouses built by the Spanish in the Philippines. Japan donated a replacement tower, which is made of iron and solar powered. The brick keeper's house is all that remains of the original structure.

Typhoon Haiyan, known in the Philippines as "Yolanda", passed over the Gigantes group, along with the rest of Panay, on November 8, 2013, damaging houses and boats. Unofficial reports stated more than 90 percent of the houses on Gigantes were destroyed. The typhoon also tore the roof off of Lantangan Elementary School in Gigantes Sur. As of June 2014, the roof of the school had not yet been repaired. Many groups conducted relief missions to the Gigantes group, including the Bureau of Fisheries and Aquatic Resources in Region 6 (BFAR-6), the Department of Social Welfare and Development (DSWD-6), RockEd Philippines-RockEd Iloilo, the ABS-CBN Foundation, Loma Linda University Health (LLUH), and the Adventist Development and Relief Agency (ADRA). In June 2014, Save the Children donated more than a thousand bags of school supplies to students on the island. Aside from food and clothing, the fishing community also asked relief organizations to help rebuild their livelihoods.

Points of interest
Points of interest in the Gigantes group include the Cabugao Gamay Island, Antonia Island, Bantigue Sand Bar, and Bakwitan Cave, one of 73 caves throughout the islands.

Tangke

Tangke (“tank”) is a saltwater lagoon on Gigantes Sur. It is surrounded by cliffs. Local legend says that the waters of Tangke would miraculously rise every year on June 24, the Birthday of Saint John the Baptist.

North Gigantes Island lighthouse 
The station was established during 1895 as one of the Spanish lighthouse projects to be built across the Philippines. The current medium-sized lighthouse that is solar-powered, like most of the lighthouses built today, was donated by Japan to replace the one built by the Spanish government due to the destruction brought by Typhoon Frank in 2008. The keeper's house survived but in ruins. The masonry walls were painted white while the roof is made out of corrugated galvanized iron sheet in red paint finish.

Cabugao Gamay 
A small island featuring a white sand beach and an observation deck.

Antonia Beach 
The private beach which belongs to a resort (Antonia Resort) on the south eastern tip of Gigantes Sur, known for its 1 peso scallops.

Transport

via Carles 
Boats can be chartered from Bancal Port in Carles. Public ferries leave daily from Bancal Port to either Gigantes Norte or Gigantes Sur. Private boats can also be chartered to reach the islands. It takes approximately an hour from Bancal Port to Gigantes islands.

via Estancia
Daily trips are also available from the port of Estancia, which can be reached via point-to-point bus operated by Ceres from their terminal just outside Iloilo City. The single trip leaves at approximately 1300 hours daily and takes about 1.5-2 hours to complete.

Gallery

See also
List of islands in the Philippines

References

External links
 

Islands of Iloilo
Tourist attractions in Iloilo